Christina Wheeler (born 15 April 1982) is an Australian retired tennis player.

Her highest WTA singles ranking is 147, which she reached on 26 May 2003. Her career high in doubles is 91, achieved on 8 July 2002. Wheeler won three ITF singles titles and ten ITF doubles titles.

She retired from professional circuit in 2008.

WTA career finals

Doubles: 1 (runner-up)

ITF Circuit finals

Singles: 11 (3–8)

Doubles: 27 (10–17)

Highest ranked player victories
No. 34 -  Tatiana Panova, 2001
No. 43 -  Amy Frazier, 2003
No. 54 -  Anna Kournikova, 2002
No. 63 -  Sara Errani, 2008
No. 64 -  Chan Yung-jan, 2008

External links
 
 
 

1982 births
Living people
People from Korosten
Ukrainian emigrants to Australia
Australian female tennis players
Sportswomen from Victoria (Australia)
People educated at Wesley College (Victoria)
Grand Slam (tennis) champions in girls' doubles
Tennis players from Melbourne
Australian Open (tennis) junior champions